Fountain International School (FIS) is a Cambridge School in Greenhills, San Juan, Metro Manila.  It has two campuses that serves the multicultural and multinational community in Metro Manila, Philippines.  FIS is an accredited Cambridge School that offers IGCSE subjects to prepare its students for international recognition.  It is also certified by College Board to offer Advanced Placement (AP) and SAT programs and assessment.

The school curriculum complies with the basic and secondary education minimum learning competencies required by the Department of Education with higher level objectives in Science, Math and English. 

It has recently become a Full Member of the European Council of International Schools (ECIS).

The school consists of a preschool and an elementary school along Annapolis Street in Greenhills, San Juan, and a high school located at Santolan Road, West Crame, San Juan.

External links

International schools in Metro Manila
Schools in San Juan, Metro Manila